"Science Fiction" is a song by Australian rock/new wave group Divinyls, which was the lead single from their first studio album Desperate. Released in December 1982, "Science Fiction", peaked at No. 13 on the Australian Kent Music Report Singles Chart. The B-side, "I'll Make You Happy" is a cover of The Easybeats 1966 hit.

In May 2001, "Science Fiction" was selected by Australasian Performing Right Association (APRA) as one of the Top 30 Australian songs of all time.

Background
Christina Amphlett and Mark McEntee (ex-Air Supply) met at the Sydney Opera House where Amphlett was singing in a choral concert in 1980. They recruited Jeremy Paul (ex-Air Supply), Bjarne Ohlin and Richard Harvey, and they provided the soundtrack for the film Monkey Grip (1982). The group released two singles from the soundtrack, Music from Monkey Grip EP, "Boys in Town", which reached No. 8 on the national singles chart, and "Only Lonely". Original bassist Jeremy Paul left before the movie or first single were released. He was replaced on bass, eventually by Rick Grossman (ex Matt Finish).

After releasing Music from Monkey Grip EP on WEA in 1982, Divinyls released their first studio album Desperate on Chrysalis Records in 1983. The album included the No. 13 hit on the Australian Kent Music Report Singles Chart, "Science Fiction" . Their early manager Vince Lovegrove was former co-lead vocalist of 1960s pop band The Valentines with Bon Scott (later in AC/DC); Lovegrove had organised Divinyls' transfer from WEA to Chrysalis and their first tours of United States. The B-side of this single is their cover version of The Easybeats' 1966 hit "I'll Make You Happy".

Track listing
 "Science Fiction" (Christina Amphlett, Mark McEntee) – 3:32
 "I'll Make You Happy" (Stevie Wright, George Young) – 3:21

Personnel
Divinyls members
 Christina Amphlett – vocals
 Mark McEntee – guitar
 Bjarne Ohlin – keyboards, guitar, backing vocals
 Richard Harvey – drums
 Rick Grossman – bass guitar

Additional musicians

Production details
 Producer – Mark Opitz

Charts

Weekly charts

Year end charts

References

1982 singles
APRA Award winners
Divinyls songs
Songs written by Chrissy Amphlett
Songs written by Mark McEntee
1982 songs
Song recordings produced by Mark Opitz